Carl T. "Pill" Nelson (December 23, 1900 – January 21, 1978) was an American football player and coach. He served as the head football coach at Beloit College in Beloit, Wisconsin from 1950 to 1961 and Milton College in Milton, Wisconsin from 1962 to 1964, compiling a career college football coaching record of 70–46–1. Nelson also the athletic director at Milton from 1965 until his retirement in 1967. He also coached track and golf at the school.

Nelson was born on December 23, 1900, in Butte, Montana, to Charles and Sophia Abrahamson Nelson. He attended Butte High School before going to Beloit College, where he played football.

Nelson on January 21, 1978, at Beloit Memorial Hospital in Beloit.

Head coaching record

College football

Notes

References

1900 births
1978 deaths
Beloit Buccaneers football coaches
Beloit Buccaneers football players
Milton Wildcats athletic directors
Milton Wildcats football coaches
College golf coaches in the United States
College track and field coaches in the United States
High school basketball coaches in Wisconsin
High school football coaches in Illinois
High school football coaches in Wisconsin
High school track and field coaches in the United States
People from Butte, Montana
Coaches of American football from Montana
Players of American football from Montana